Pay-by-plate machines are a subset of ticket machines used for regulating parking in urban areas or in parking lots. They enable customers to purchase parking time by using their license plate number.  The machines print a receipt that generally displays the location, machine number, start time, expiration time, amount paid, and license plate.

Principles
The pay-by-plate system services multiple vehicles by making the driver input the license plate information into a machine. This system results in lower setup costs and less maintenance, but prevents drivers from taking advantage of parking meters that have time remaining. In many cities, pay-by-plate has replaced the roadside parking meter and the pay and display machines. The advantage to the city could be: increased revenue, increased compliance, fewer disputed tickets, increased parking space utilization and/or reduction in staff [see Results section].

The advantage to the driver is that the vehicle could be moved to another parking spot and still have a paid status compared to other systems. Previously with parking meters and pay by space, the payment did not follow the driver which resulted in a parking ticket if they decided to move spaces. In addition to this advantage, the driver could also purchase time by phone so that the driver does not have to go back to the machine to extend their parking session. The pay by plate machines accept coins, credit cards, debit cards and NFC for smart phone payments, making it unnecessary for drivers to carry large amounts of change. The use of debit cards, credit cards and NFC are also advantageous to the city as they do not have to empty the machines as often lowering the cost of maintenance. It can also help to limit pilfering by employees who empty the parking meters.

Enforcement 
Enforcement of license plates is done in one of three ways: by manual plate entry into a handheld device, by Automated License Plate Recognition (ALPR) in a handheld device or by vehicle mounted ALPR. The enforcement officer enters the plate manually or automatically depending on the technology used, and the system looks up payment information to see if the vehicle is parked legally. Illegally parked vehicles are issued a citation in real-time on the windshield or through a post-processed mail out method. Payments are retrieved from multiple sources from phone payments to on street payment machines. This process allows the parking enforcement officer to quickly determine who has and has not paid resulting in larger revenues for the city through citations and/or compliance.

Hand Held 
Manual hand held devices look up the plate that the user manually enters. This method is prone to human error for data entry and has no photographic evidence to save (without separately taking a photo). Hand held ALPR comes in two flavors: ones that take single shot pictures to run ALPR against, and ones that run the camera in video mode performing ALPR on the stream of images. The single shot method takes longer but the full resolution of the camera is at its disposal. The live video mode is limited to the resolution of the video stream but has the advantage of running multiple images from subtly different angles. To date there has been no study as to which method results in the best ALPR read on a handheld device but arguments could be made for and against both.

Handheld devices have the advantage over vehicle mounted systems of being cheaper and able to enforce vehicles in tight spaces that an enforcement vehicle could not reach. There are also states and provinces that only have a license plate on the rear of the vehicle, making vehicle mounted ALPR impossible on vehicles that are backed into a parking space. However, handheld systems cannot match the efficiency of a vehicle mounted ALPR system travelling upwards of 60 km/h.

Vehicle Mounted ALPR 
See main article: Automatic number plate recognition In mobile systems.

As it pertains to pay by plate, the payments are either pushed or pulled from a web service so that the enforcement vehicle always has up to date payment information. ALPR enabled parking enforcement vehicles typically travel at speeds upwards of 60 km/h all the while checking multiple license plates per second and verifying payment. Handheld systems cannot match the efficiency of this, however vehicle mounted ALPR systems are typically a magnitude more expensive. As mentioned before, vehicle mounted ALPR systems are not suited for all areas where an enforcement vehicle cannot "see" the license plate due to parking angle, plate placement, road geometry, etc. In those areas, handhelds are the best option.

Installations
In Canada, the first pay-by-plate system was unveiled in Calgary, AB on September 20, 2007.  This was a system commissioned by the Calgary Parking Authority using CALE pay machines, Tannery Creek Systems autoChalk enforcement technology, and MTS Allstream for pay by cellphone and was branded under the ParkPlus banner. For their efforts, the ParkPlus system was awarded the 2009 Institute of Transportation Engineers (ITE) Best Practices Award.

Whistler, BC followed suit on July 12, 2010 unveiling its Pay by Plate system consisting of CALE pay machines, and gtechna enforcement technology.  Since the ParkPlus system issues mailout tickets it is not considered "real-time", thus the Whistler installation is the first real-time system in Canada. However, in late 2015, the Calgary Parking Authority unveiled a new system for issuing tickets in real time at the street level using hand-held tablets and portable printers that access the pay-by-plate information in the ParkPlus system.

In the USA, the first pay-by-plate system to go live with real-time enforcement was in Denver Colorado. On February 2008, the Regional Transportation District rolled out a system consisting of MacKay Meters, MacKay Guardian Multi pay stations and Federal APD PIPS mobile LPR enforcement system.  The system features optional receipts that consumers don't need to put on their dash and vehicle mounted ALPR at speeds up to 30 mph for enforcement.

The largest Pay-By-Plate parking system in the world was installed by Global Parking Solutions (GPS) for Brisbane City Council in Brisbane, Australia, in 2009. GPS supplied and installed more than 1000 Metropolis Pay-by-Plate terminals for Brisbane City Council and also custom-built a comprehensive parking system, including enforcement, Pay-by-Phone, central management system, credit card transactions, and more. The solution cost 33% less than allocated capex budget and reduced opex by 33%. The system has the potential to integrate other technologies such as Pay by Phone and reduce the number of terminals.

While Norwalk, CT launched their plate enabled permit system on March 25, 2011, it was not a true pay-by-plate system as it utilized parking permits instead and takes a pay-by-space approach. It was a project managed and driven by LAZ Parking utilizing the gtechna Permit System, Cale pay by space pay stations, ParkMobile pay by phone system, and gtechna Officer Plate system.  The only piece missing to make this a complete plate processing solution, is the parking terminal.  With no parking terminal and pay by space, this breaks the plate enforcement efficiency in the field.

Washington, DC has done some trial tests with Pay by Plate (Fall 2010), and will probably proceed with this technology.  As of May 2014, Washington, DC the only component available for the "parker" to pay plate for parking, is with the ParkMobile mobile system.

Pittsburgh, PA is implementing the largest Pay-by-Plate parking terminal project in the USA.  This project has started on July 26, 2012.  As of January 2013, Pittsburgh Parking Authority has completed the installation of 550+ Pay-by-Plate parking terminals.  Every Parking Terminal is modem enabled, and is transmigrating all payments for parking in real-time.  All the parking officers (PEO's) in Pittsburgh, and using Honneywell 9900 mobile hand held computers to enforce the "parkers" vehicle plate.  This technology is also installed in all off-street lots within the City of Pittsburgh.  The enforcement solution provider in Pittsburgh, PA is gtechna corporation. This will be the largest USA pay-by-plate  campaign to date.

For Pittsburgh, PA the Parking Authority has now (Sept 2014) installed 800+ pay by plate parking terminals.  These terminals generate over 25,000 transactions per day for on-street and off-street parking.  The technology used for terminals supplied by CALE America and to enforce / verify the plate it is an Android smartphone & Officer eTicket software provided by gtechna.  Mr. Mastronardi CTO of gtechna, is watching the pay by plate at Pittsburgh very closely since it requires extreme tight integration with the meter and pay by phone suppliers.

Parkmobile pay by phone solution has been installed in Pittsburgh, allowing the "parkers" to have full use of the pay by plate solution within a city with 2 technologies.  The challenges remain on the enforcement side, and gtechna has implemented a centralized parking rights gateway allowing the process of all "parkers" data to be captured in 1 server.

Results

ParkPlus/Calgary, Alberta 
The ParkPlus System in Calgary, Alberta has seen the following benefits:
 15% increase in net operating revenue
 Payment compliance improved by 19%
 60% less disputed tickets
 Curbside parking space utilization increased by 10%
 38% reduction in enforcement staff

Pittsburgh, Pennsylvania 
In Pittsburgh, Pennsylvania the following results were achieved:
 Revenue tripled from 2011's $5.5 million to 2015's $17.1 million. An increase of 211%.

See also

Decriminalised parking enforcement
Parking guidance and information
License Plate Recognition

References

Street furniture
Parking
Vehicle registration plates